This is a list of music festivals in the United States organized by state and then by name. It includes current and past notable festivals.

Touring festivals 
 Rolling Loud
 Budweiser Made in America Festival
 Electric Daisy Carnival
 Identity Festival
 Mayhem Festival
 Ozzfest
 Rock the Bells
 Warped Tour

Alabama 

 Bayfest, Mobile
 Big Spring Jam, Huntsville
 Hangout Music Fest, Gulf Shores

Arizona 

 DUSK Music Festival, Tucson
 Innings Festival, Tempe

Arkansas 

King Biscuit Blues Festival, Helena
Backwoods at Mulberry Mountain, Ozark
Ozark Mountain Music Festival

California 

 Wonderfront Music and Arts Festival, San Diego

Colorado 

 Mile High Music Festival, Commerce City
 Snowball music festival, Avon
 Aspen Music Festival and School, Aspen

Connecticut 

 Gathering of the Vibes, Bridgeport
 Norfolk Music Festival, Norfolk

Delaware 

 Firefly Music Festival Dover, Delaware
Weedstock Townsend, Delaware

Florida 

 Pepsi Gulf Coast Jam, Panama City Beach
SandJam Fest, Panama City Beach
Harvest of Hope Fest, St. Augustine
 Langerado Music Festival, Sunrise
 SunFest, West Palm Beach
 Ultra Music Festival, Miami
 Tortuga Music Festival, Fort Lauderdale
 Tipper and Friends, Live Oak
 Hulaween, Live Oak
 Electric Daisy Carnival, Orlando
 Okeechobee Music & Arts Festival, Okeechobee

Georgia 

 Athfest, Athens
 The Echo Project, Atlanta
Imagine Music Festival, Atlanta
 Music Midtown, Atlanta
Savannah Stop-Over, Savannah
Savannah Music Festival, Savannah
Shaky Knees, Atlanta
Shaky Beats, Atlanta
 TomorrowWorld, Chattahoochee Hill

Hawaii 

 Aloha Festivals
 Merrie Monarch Festival, Hilo

Idaho 

 Treefort Music Fest, Boise

Illinois 

 Chicago Blues Festival, Chicago
 Chicago Jazz Festival, Chicago
 Intonation Music Festival, Chicago
 Lollapalooza, Chicago
 North Coast Music Festival, Chicago
 Pitchfork Music Festival, Chicago
 Pygmalion Music Festival, Champaign-Urbana
 Riot Fest, Chicago
 Spring Awakening, Chicago
 Summer Camp Music Festival, Chillicothe

Indiana 

 Masterworks festival, Winona Lake
 World Pulse Festival, South Bend
 Notre Dame Collegiate Jazz Festival, Notre Dame
Middle Waves Music Festival, Fort Wayne
ParksFest Music Festival, Evansville, Indiana
Culture Shock Music Festival, Bloomington, Indiana

Iowa 

 80/35 Music Festival, Des Moines
 Hinterland Music Festival, St. Charles, Iowa

Kansas 

 Electronic Music Midwest, Kansas City

Dancefest

Kentucky 

 Forecastle Festival, Louisville
 Hot August Blues Festival, Aurora (near Murray)
 ROMP by International Bluegrass Music Museum, Owensboro, Kentucky

Louisiana 

 Bayou Country Superfest, Baton Rouge
 Essence Music Festival, New Orleans
 Festival International de Louisiane, Lafayette
 French Quarter Festival, New Orleans
 New Orleans Jazz and Heritage Festival, New Orleans
 Voodoo Music Experience, New Orleans
 BUKU Music + Art Project, New Orleans

Maine

Maryland 

 Takoma Park Folk Festival, Takoma Park
 Virgin Festival, Baltimore
 Moonrise Festival, Baltimore
 All Things Go Fall Classic, Washington, DC

Massachusetts

Michigan 

 Electric Forest Festival, Rothbury
 Faster Horses Festival, Brooklyn
Michigan Womyn's Music Festival, Hart

Minnesota 

 10,000 Lakes Festival, Detroit Lakes
 Rock the Garden, Minneapolis
 Sonshine Festival, Willmar
 Soundset Music Festival, Minneapolis-Saint Paul

Mississippi 

 Atwood Music Festival, Monticello
 CPR Fest, Biloxi
 Crawfish Music Festival, Biloxi

Missouri 

 LouFest, St. Louis
 Missouri Chamber Music Festival, Webster Groves
 Opera Theatre of Saint Louis, St. Louis
 Ozark Music Festival, Sedalia
 Paint Louis, St. Louis
 Pointfest, Maryland Heights
 Schwagstock, Shannon County
 Twilight Festival, Columbia
 Roots N Blues Festival, Columbia

Nebraska 

 Comstock Music Festivals, Comstock
 Maha Music Festival, Omaha

Nevada 
 Day N Vegas, * Las Vegas Festival Grounds
 Electric Daisy Carnival, Las Vegas (Los Angeles, California pre-2011)
 Vegoose, Las Vegas

New Hampshire 

 New Hampshire Music Festival, Plymouth

New Jersey 

 The Bamboozle, East Rutherford

New York

North Carolina 

 Carolina Rebellion, Concord
 Hopscotch Music Festival, Raleigh
 Merlefest, Wilkesboro
 Moogfest, Asheville
 Signal - The Southeast Electronic Music Festival, Chapel Hill/Carrboro

Ohio 

 Bunbury Music Festival, Cincinnati
 EST fEST Butler, Ohio
 MidPoint Music Festival, Cincinnati
 MusicNOW Festival, Cincinnati
 Nelsonville Music Festival, Nelsonville
 Rock N Resort Music Festival, North Lawrence
 Sonic Temple art & music festival, Columbus
 Lost Lands Music Festival, Legend Valley

Oklahoma 

 Backwoods Music Festival, Stroud
 Rocklahoma, Pryor
 Canna-Cause, Caddo Creek Retreat, Ardmore, Oklahoma

Oregon 

 MusicfestNW, Portland
 Sisters Folk Festival, Sisters

Pennsylvania 
 Blast Furnace Blues Festival, Bethlehem
 Budweiser Made in America Festival, Philadelphia
 Concert 10, Pocono International Raceway, Long Pond, Pennsylvania
 Creation Festival, Mount Union
 Flood City Music Festival, Johnstown
 Musikfest, Bethlehem
 Philadelphia Folk Festival, Upper Salford
 The Peach Music Festival, Scranton

Puerto Rico 

 Electric Daisy Carnival

Rhode Island 

 Newport Folk Festival, Newport
 Newport Jazz Festival, Newport
 Newport Music Festival, Newport

South Carolina 

 Carolina Country Music Fest, Myrtle Beach
 Hotel Carolina, Isle of Palms

Tennessee 

 Beale Street Music Festival, Memphis
 Bonnaroo, Manchester
 Bristol Rhythm & Roots Reunion, Bristol, Tennessee/Virginia
 CMA Music Festival, Nashville
 Moon River Music Festival, Memphis

Texas 

 Austin City Limits Music Festival, Austin
 Astroworld Festival, Houston
 Free Press Summer Fest, Houston
 Fun Fun Fun Fest, Austin
 Kerrville Folk Festival, Kerrville
 Never Say Never Festival, Mission
 Old Settler's Music Festival, Driftwood
 South by Southwest, Austin
 Ubbi Dubbi, Ennis

Utah 

 Deer Valley Music Festival, Park City
 Groovefest American Music Festival, Cedar City
 X96 Toyota Big Ass Show, Salt Lake City
 Das Energi, Salt Lake City

Virginia 

 Bristol Rhythm & Roots Reunion, Bristol, Tennessee/Virginia
 FloydFest, Floyd County
 Rooster Walk, Henry County
 Lockn' Festival, Arrington
 Something in the Water Festival, Virginia Beach
 Blue Ridge Rock Festival, Danville
Patriotic Festival,Virginia Beach, Virginia

Washington 
 Summer Meltdown, Darrington
 Bumbershoot, Seattle
 Creation Festival, Enumclaw
 Decibel Festival, Seattle
 Endfest, Bremerton / George / Auburn / Seattle
 Sasquatch! Music Festival, George
 Summer Solstice Parade and Pageant, Fremont
 Watershed Music Festival, George

Wisconsin 

 County Line Country Fest
 Great River Folk Festival
 Lifest, Oshkosh
 Rock Fest, Cadott
 Country Fest, Cadott
 Hodag Country Fest, Rhinelander
 Summerfest, Milwaukee
 Steel Bridge Songfest, Sturgeon Bay Bridge
 Mile of Music, Appleton Wisconsin
 Electric City Music Festival, Kaukauna Wisconsin

References 

United States
United States